Peter Milburn (born 25 January 1945) is a Caymanian sailor. He competed in the 470 event at the 1976 Summer Olympics.

References

External links
 

1945 births
Living people
Caymanian male sailors (sport)
Olympic sailors of the Cayman Islands
Sailors at the 1976 Summer Olympics – 470
Place of birth missing (living people)